Miguel Ángel López may refer to:

 Miguel Ángel López (footballer) (born 1942), Argentinian football player and manager of Club América
 Miguel Ángel Sánchez López (born 1980), Nicaraguan footballer
 Miguel Ángel López (racewalker) (born 1988), Spanish racewalker
 Miguel Ángel López Jaén (born 1982), Spanish tennis player
 Miguel Ángel López Velasco (1956–2011), Mexican journalist
 Miguel Ángel López-Cedrón (born 1978), Spanish footballer
 Miguel Ángel López (cyclist) (born 1994), Colombian cyclist
 Miguel Ángel López (volleyball) (born 1997), Cuban volleyball player
 Rey Misterio (Miguel Ángel López Díaz, born 1948), Mexican professional wrestler